is a railway station of the Chūō Main Line, East Japan Railway Company (JR East) in Sangasho, in the city of Yamanashi, Yamanashi Prefecture, Japan.

Lines
Higashi-Yamanashi Station is served by the Chūō Main Line, and is 120.1  kilometers from the terminus of the line at Tokyo Station.

Station layout
The station consists of two unnumbered opposed side platforms connected by a level crossing. The station is unattended.

Platforms

History 
Higashi-Yamanashi Station opened on February 5, 1957 as a passenger station on the JNR (Japanese National Railways). It has been unattended since October 1970. With the dissolution and privatization of the JNR on April 1, 1987, the station came under the control of the East Japan Railway Company. Automated turnstiles using the Suica IC Card system came into operation from October 16, 2004.

Passenger statistics
In fiscal 2010, the station was used by an average of 669 passengers daily (boarding passengers only).
|}

Surrounding area
Seihaku-ji

See also
 List of railway stations in Japan

References

 Miyoshi Kozo. Chuo-sen Machi to eki Hyaku-niju nen. JT Publishing (2009)

External links
JR East Higashi-Yamanashi Station

Railway stations in Yamanashi Prefecture
Railway stations in Japan opened in 1957
Chūō Main Line
Stations of East Japan Railway Company
Yamanashi, Yamanashi